Akiva Govrin (12 August 1902 – 26 June 1980) was an Israeli politician who served as a government minister between December 1963 and January 1966, and was the country's first Minister of Tourism.

Biography
Born in the Podolia region of the Russian Empire (today in Ukraine), Govrin was one of the founders of the HeHalutz movement in Ukraine. He made aliyah to Mandatory Palestine in 1922, and worked at Haifa Port and as a construction worker in Jerusalem, where he was one of the founders of the Jerusalem Workers' Council.

In 1925 he became a member of the actions committee of the Histadrut, and headed its unions department between 1943 and 1949. In 1949 he was elected to the Knesset on Mapai's list and was appointed chairman of the Labor committee. He was re-elected in 1951, 1955, 1959 and 1961. On 1 December 1963 he was appointed Minister without Portfolio, and when Levi Eshkol formed a new government in December 1964, Govrin became the country's first Minister of Tourism.

Although he retained his seat in the 1965 elections, he was left out of the new cabinet. He lost his seat in the 1969 elections.

His niece Michal Govrin is an accomplished novelist and theater director.

External links
 

1902 births
1980 deaths
Alignment (Israel) politicians
20th-century Israeli Jews
Israeli Labor Party politicians
Israeli people of Ukrainian-Jewish descent
Jewish Israeli politicians
Jews in Mandatory Palestine
Mapai politicians
Members of the 1st Knesset (1949–1951)
Members of the 2nd Knesset (1951–1955)
Members of the 3rd Knesset (1955–1959)
Members of the 4th Knesset (1959–1961)
Members of the 5th Knesset (1961–1965)
Members of the 6th Knesset (1965–1969)
Ministers of Tourism of Israel
Soviet emigrants to Mandatory Palestine
Soviet Jews
Ukrainian Jews